Herbert Shutt (3 September 1879 – 19 November 1922) was an English first-class cricketer.

Shutt was born in September 1879 at Ardwick, Lancashire. For many years he was a club cricketer in Southern England at Aldershot, with Shutt being selected to play for Hampshire in the 1906 season. He made four first-class appearances during that season, debuting against the touring West Indians and making a further three appearances in the County Championship. Playing as a left-arm fast bowler, he took 8 wickets in his four matches at an average of 28.87, with best figures of 4 for 29. He later returned to the North-West, where he was engaged by Heywood Cricket Club as their professional in 1908. Shutt played minor matches for Cumberland from 1910 to 1914, with a final minor appearance coming in July 1922; he died five months later at Whitehaven on 19 November 1922, with his final words reportedly being "the last ball of the over".

References

External links

1879 births
1922 deaths
People from Ardwick
Cricketers from Manchester
English cricketers
Hampshire cricketers